Bear corn is a common name for several plants and may refer to:
Veratrum viride also known as Indian poke, Indian hellebore, false hellebore, green false hellebore
Conopholis americana also known as cancer-root or squawroot

References